Route 221, also known as Burin Road, is a  east–west highway on the Burin Peninsula of the island of Newfoundland in the province of Newfoundland and Labrador. It connects Fox Cove-Mortier with Port au Bras, Burin, and Route 220 (Burin Peninsula Highway).

Route description

Route 221 begins in Burin in the Salt Pond portion of town at an intersection with Route 220. It heads south along an inland waterway to pass through Burin Bay Arm, Little Salmonier, Long Cove, and Downtown to come to an intersection with Main Street, which provides access to many of the other neighbourhoods of town. The highway now heads east to pass through Bulls Cove to leave Burin and pass through Port au Bras. Route 221 now enters Fox Cove-Mortier and passes through the Mortier portion of town before passing through rural wooded areas for a few kilometres. Route 221 now enters Fox Cove and passes through neighbourhoods before coming to an end at an intersection with Anile's Cove Road and Dimmer's Lane.

Major intersections

References

221